The 1976 Kansas State Wildcats football team represented Kansas State University in the 1976 NCAA Division I football season, coached by Ellis Rainsberger. They played their home games in KSU Stadium.

Schedule

References

Kansas State
Kansas State Wildcats football seasons
Kansas State Wildcats football